Zdeněk Bohutínský (born May 16, 1946) is a Czechoslovak sprint canoer who competed in the early to mid-1970s. Competing in two Summer Olympics, he earned his best finish of ninth in the K-4 1000 m event at Munich in 1972.

References
Sports-reference.com profile

1946 births
Canoeists at the 1972 Summer Olympics
Canoeists at the 1976 Summer Olympics
Czechoslovak male canoeists
Living people
Olympic canoeists of Czechoslovakia